Asphalt 4: Elite Racing is a racing game published and developed by Gameloft. The fourth major game of Asphalt series. It was released on iOS and iPod on August 28, 2008; N-Gage on January 20, 2009; mobile phones in mid-July 2008; and DSiWare on July 6, 2009. This game marks the first game in the Asphalt series to be released for iOS. The game was retired later, in 2014, after its successor: Asphalt 5 was removed from the App Store.

Gameplay 
The main gameplay involves the player starting out with one or two of the most basic cars and earning money by winning races and performing illegal acts. Money can then be spent on upgrades or new cars. Game modes include Beat 'em All, where the player has to destroy the cars of as many rival racers as possible, and Cop Chase, where they switch roles as a police officer trying to catch the leading car of an illegal street race.

Development 
Asphalt 4: Elite Racing was developed in 2008 for iOS and iPods that have click wheels.

Reception 

Asphalt 4: Elite Racing received "generally favorable reviews" according to the review aggregator Metacritic.

References 

2008 video games
Asphalt (series)
BlackBerry games
DSiWare games
Gameloft games
IOS games
IPod games
J2ME games
N-Gage service games
Video games about police officers
Video games developed in France
Video games set in Dubai
Video games set in Hawaii
Video games set in India
Video games set in the Las Vegas Valley
Video games set in Los Angeles
Video games set in Monaco
Video games set in New York City
Video games set in Paris
Video games set in Rome
Video games set in San Francisco
Video games set in Saint Petersburg
Video games set in Shanghai
Symbian software games
Symbian games